"Smooth Up in Ya" (also released under the title "Smooth Up") is the debut single by American glam metal band BulletBoys, released in 1988. It is from their eponymous debut studio album, BulletBoys. The song was a moderate commercial success, peaking at number 71 on the Billboard Hot 100, and number 23 on the Album Rock Tracks chart in 1989.

Music video
The music video features the band performing the song on a darkened stage set. Various caricature illustrations are shown throughout the video, one of which was used as the cover art for the single.

Howard Johnson writing for Classic Rock ranked the song's video at No. 10 on their list of "The Top 10 Best Hair Metal Videos".

Track listing
7" single

12" single

In other media
The song is featured in the 2010 film Hot Tub Time Machine, but does not appear on the soundtrack.

The song makes an appearance in the third episode of the HBO teen drama series Euphoria.

Charts

References

1988 songs
1988 debut singles
BulletBoys songs
Song recordings produced by Ted Templeman
Warner Music Group singles